The Utes were unable to get another bowl bid in the 1997 season, going just 6–5. This was also the last season in the old Rice Stadium. Immediately after the final home game (against Rice University), the stadium was torn down and rebuilt into the new Rice-Eccles Stadium, partly in anticipation of the upcoming 2002 Olympic Games.

Schedule

Game summaries

BYU

After the season

NFL draft
Two players went in the 1998 NFL Draft, including one in the first round (Kevin Dyson).

References

Utah
Utah Utes football seasons
Utah Utes football